The Rodger River is a perennial river of the Snowy River catchment, located in the Alpine region of the Australian state of Victoria.

Course and features
The Rodger River rises below Monkeytop in a remote alpine wilderness area within the Snowy River National Park, and flows generally south, then west, then south, then south by west, joined by the Yalmy River and three minor tributaries, before reaching its confluence with the Snowy River downstream of Jackson Crossing in the Shire of East Gippsland. The river descends  over its  course.

The entire course of the river is contained with the Snowy River National Park.

The traditional custodians of the land surrounding the Rodger River are the Australian Aboriginal Bidawal and Nindi-Ngudjam Ngarigu Monero peoples.

See also

 List of rivers of Australia

References

External links
 
 
 

East Gippsland catchment
Rivers of Gippsland (region)